Thomas Muster defeated Aaron Krickstein in the final, 6–3, 6–1, 6–3 to win the singles tennis title at the 1992 Monte Carlo Open.

Sergi Bruguera was the defending champion, but lost in the second round to Goran Prpić.

Seeds

  Boris Becker (third round)
  Pete Sampras (second round)
  Michael Stich (quarterfinals)
  Guy Forget (third round)
  Goran Ivanišević (withdrew)
  Petr Korda (second round)
  Alberto Mancini (second round)
  Magnus Gustafsson (second round)
  Karel Nováček (third round)
  Emilio Sánchez (third round)
  Sergi Bruguera (second round)
  Richard Krajicek (first round)
  Alexander Volkov (second round)
  Jakob Hlasek (first round)
  Wayne Ferreira (third round)
  Aaron Krickstein (final)

Draw

Finals

Top half

Section 1

Section 2

Bottom half

Section 3

Section 4

External links
 ATP Singles draw

Singles